The Port of Zhenjiang is a natural inland river port located on Zhengjiang Prefectural Level city, Jiangsu, People's Republic of China. It is one of the succession of large shipping hubs lining the estuary and lower course of the Yangtze. The Port had a throughput of 140,984,000 tonnes of total cargo in 2013, an increase of 4.7%

Setting
Port of Zhenjiang extends on the South Bank of the Yangtze River between Nanjing and Changzhou. The river channel depth averages 11 m, capable of handling ships of up to 50,000 DWT year-round. The Grand Canal's Jiangnan section enters the Yangtze at Zhenjiang.

History 
There has been a major port at the location at least since late Han dynasty days. As the port straddled the confluence of the Grand Canal and the Yangtze river, it was a major hub for most Imperial times, its prosperity oscillating with the degree of repair of the Canal.

Chingkiang was one of the ports opened to foreign trade in 1858 by the Tianjin Treaties

Layout
The Port of Zhenjiang extends over 33.8 km of shoreline, and it is divided into seven main port areas:
 Gaozi Port Area : On the north shore of the Yangtze.
 Longmen Port Area:
 Zhenjiang Port Area: the old port area, has a channel depth of 4m. It is currently being discontinued and re-purposed.
 Jianbi Port Area : includes the confluence of the Grand Canal.
 Dagang Port Area : It is the main port area, currently with 8 berths of 25,000 DWT, 2 of 5,000 DWT, 1 of 2,000 DWT and 11 barge berths of 100 DWT. The Dagang Port Area Phase III, currently under construction, has 1 container berth of 50,000 DWT, 1 multiple use berth of 30,000 DWT, 1 general cargo berth of 50,000 DWT, 1 bulk cargo berth of 70,000 DWT, 2 berths for 5,000 DWT large Yangtze barges and a river basin for 12 500 DWT barges.
 Gaoqiao Port Area :
 Yangzhong Port Area : Mostly in development

Administration
The Zhenjiang Port Group Co Ltd was created in 2005 from the merger of the Zhenjiang City Port Management Bureau and the Zhenjiang Port Limited Company

Operations

Workboats
As of 2012,

References

External links
 Zhenjiang Port Group website

Ports and harbours of China